A. tumescens may refer to:

Acanthocephalus tumescens, a species of parasitic worm.
Amphipneustes tumescens, a species of sea urchin.
Terrabacter tumescens (formerly Arthrobacter tumescens), a Gram-positive bacterium.